Felipe Bortolucci Pires (born August 21, 1993), sometimes known as just Felipe, is a Brazilian football player.

Playing career
Felipe Bortolucci played for J2 League club; Tochigi SC in 2015 season.

References

External links

1993 births
Living people
Brazilian footballers
Brazilian people of Italian descent
J2 League players
Tochigi SC players
Brazilian expatriate footballers
Expatriate footballers in Japan
Association football defenders